The Magic Loungeabout was a music festival held in the grounds of Broughton Hall, North Yorkshire.

Originally held in the grounds of Newburgh Priory in Coxwold in 2008, it moved to Broughton Hall in 2011.

The festival was only held three times, in 2008, 2011, and in 2012.

Format of Festival
The festival took place over a full weekend, with the Saturday focused on electropop, whilst the Sunday was more acoustic lead.

The event that was planned for 2010, also saw the intention of 15 new areas on the site including concierge service, pop up restaurants, a cinema, speakers tent, grown up games area, themed camping areas, video projections, walk about art, and VIP day tent packages with waiter service, however, the festival was cancelled and returned for its final edition in 2011. The festival advertised itself as a "refined unwind".

Lineups

2008

30–31 August 2008, held at Newburgh Priory, Coxwold
 Eliza Doolittle (singer)
 Pacific
 The Egg
 Nouvelle Vague
 Morcheeba
 Ladytron
 Gary Numan
 John Kelly

2009
No festival was held because of the economic downturn.

2010
No festival was held because of the economic downturn; whilst 2009 was intended not to run, the 2010 event was supposed to take place but was cancelled.

2011

29–31 July 2011, held at Broughton Hall, Skipton.
 The Human League
 Badly Drawn Boy
 New Young Pony Club
 Fenech Soler
 Florrie
 Graeme Park
 Clint Boon
 Ed Sheeran

2012

27–29 July 2012, held at Broughton Hall, Skipton.
 The Charlatans
 Juan Zelada
 Chic
 Lucy Rose
 Summer Camp
 Benjamin Francis Leftwich 
 Stuart Maconie
 Kevin Saunders
 Smoove and Turrell

References

External links
 The Magic Loungeabout official website

Music festivals in North Yorkshire